The 2003–04 Anycall Professional Basketball season was the eighth season of the Korean Basketball League.

Regular season

Playoffs

Prize money
Jeonju KCC Egis: KRW 130,000,000 (champions + regular-season 2nd place)
Wonju TG Sambo Xers: KRW 100,000,000 (runners-up + regular-season 1st place)
Daegu Orions: KRW 20,000,000 (regular-season 3rd place)

External links
Official KBL website (Korean & English)

2003–04
2003–04 in South Korean basketball
2003–04 in Asian basketball leagues